Nikola Raoma (born February 3, 1977) is a reputable soccer player. He was selected for the Fiji National Team, and played in the 2006 Germany World Cup qualifications in 2004 against Vanuatu, American Samoa and Papua New Guinea national teams.

Raoma played for Club Néo-zélandais from 2003 through to part of 2006. Raoma has been playing for Western Suburbs Sunshine soccer club in Australia since the 2006 season. Raoma was also part of the 2014 Nadi Soccer team that qualified for the regional clubs football competition.

References

1977 births
Fijian footballers
Living people
Sportspeople from Nadi
I-Taukei Fijian people
Fiji international footballers
Association football defenders
2004 OFC Nations Cup players